The Taça Cidade de São Paulo was a tournament organized by Federação Paulista de Futebol (FPF), reuniting the three best placed teams of previously season Campeonato Paulista edition. It was the first competition originally created by the FPF, founded in 1941. All the games was disputed at the newly built Estádio do Pacaembu.

The tournament ended in 1952, when Corinthians won the definitive possession of the trophy after conquering it 5 times.

List of champions

Following is the list with all the champions of the Taça Cidade de São Paulo:

Titles by team

References

Football in São Paulo